D.A.V. (Boys) Senior Secondary School, Mogappair is an all boys school that was established in the year 1989 as a part of D.A.V Group of Schools, Chennai. The school is a sister concern of D.A.V. Boys Senior Secondary School, Gopalapuram. The primary medium of instruction for all non-language subjects is English. The school is managed by the Tamil Nadu Arya Samaj Educational Society, Chennai, a limb of Arya Samaj (Central); Chennai, under the Societies Act XXI of 1860, Sl. No.101 of 1974. The school educates students from LKG to class XII.

Campus
The school is located amidst a salubrious atmosphere at Mogappair, Chennai. This school is exclusive for Boys and currently hosts around 2750 Boys on its rolls. The Senior Secondary School has 71 class rooms, administrative offices, laboratories, art, Work-Experience, Computer Science sections, a library and a Reading Room. The multipurpose auditorium provides space for two indoor badminton courts and table tennis tables. There is a full-length play field for major games like cricket, football. Well laid courts for volleyball, throw-ball, basketball, etc. are also available. A special play area is reserved for the Nursery kids.

Academics
D.A.V (Boys) Senior Secondary School, Mogappair ostensibly boasts of consistent and note-worthy academic records since inception,  while consistently falling short. The high standard of education offered is justified by the Board Exam results which have always been 100% pass with very high averages in all subjects, and a very large number of students achieving distinction. The results of AISSCE and AISSE held in March 2017 have also been excellent.

Student life
The school barely provides avenues for the development of its students. While Physical Education, Work Experience, Drawing and Painting, Music, Moral education, Yoga, Karate, NCC (National Cadet Corps) and R.S.P.(Road Safety Patrol) form an integral part of the school curriculum,  students are discouraged from pursuing the same. To give ample opportunities to the children to develop leadership qualities and grow into balanced personalities, the prefectorial and the House systems have been a permanent feature. Under the House systems Inter-House Competitions in debating, quiz, essay writing, short-story writing, music, painting etc. are conducted. Inter-House games and athletics form an integral part of the co-curricular activities. The students are encouraged and provided with opportunities to participate in Inter-School Competitions.

References

High schools and secondary schools in Chennai